Jack Mangan (6 May 1927 – 17 September 2013) was an Irish former Gaelic footballer who played as a goalkeeper for the Galway senior team.

Mangan is regarded as one of Galway's greatest-ever goalkeepers. He made his debut for the team during the 1948 and was a regular member of the starting fifteen until his retirement due to injury a decade later. During that time he won one All-Ireland winners' medal and four Connacht winners' medals. In 1956 he captained the side to the All-Ireland title.

At club level Mangan enjoyed a successful career with Tuam Stars in Galway and Ballymun Kickhams in Dublin.

References

 

1927 births
2013 deaths
Tuam Stars Gaelic footballers
Galway inter-county Gaelic footballers
Connacht inter-provincial Gaelic footballers
Gaelic football goalkeepers
All-Ireland-winning captains (football)
People from Tuam